Coilia nasus, also known as ungeo and the Japanese grenadier anchovy or Chinese tapertail anchovy is a species of ray-finned fish from the family Engraulidae (anchovies). It grows to  total length; it is a relatively large species for its genus. It is an example of an anadromous fish species, with some populations moving to freshwater to spawn. Overall they are distributed in the northwest Pacific, between 21–42°N and 109–134°E, or from Guangdong in China to the west coast of the Korean peninsula and the Ariake Sound in southwestern Japan. A traditional delicacy, the species is commercially fished in Korea, China and Japan. In China it is one of the most expensive fish sold, and as the anadromous variety is more expensive than the freshwater variety, the industry is mostly focussed in the Yellow Sea, East China Sea, and Yangtze.

Some Chinese populations migrate anadromously every spring up the Yangtze River before their final gonadal maturation in order to spawn in the middle and lower reaches of the Yangtze. After this the mature fish then migrate back to the sea. Other groups have been reported to be resident in freshwater lakes during their entire life cycle, making the species an interesting model of partial migration or migratory dimorphism. To understand this process a 870Mb length reference genome has been assembled, and using this a population genetics study of representative freshwater and migratory individuals has probed deeper into the molecular mechanisms of migratory adaptation.

References 

nasus
Fish of the Pacific Ocean
Fish of Korea
Oily fish
Taxa named by Coenraad Jacob Temminck
Taxa named by Hermann Schlegel
Fish described in 1846